Brookman is a surname. Notable people with the surname include:

David Brookman (Australian politician) (1917–2000), Australian politician
David Brookman, Baron Brookman (born 1937), British trade unionist and politician
George Brookman (1850–1927), Australian businessman and politician
Herman Brookman (1891–1973), American architect
Norman Brookman (1884–1949), Australian politician
William Brookman (1859–1910), Australian businessman and politician
Lester George Brookman (1904–1971), American philatelist

Fictional characters
Kathy Brookman, character on the ITV soap opera Emmerdale

See also
 Brookmans Park, Hertfordshire, England